Philothea is an unincorporated community in Mercer County, in the U.S. state of Ohio.

History
A post office called Philothea was established in 1886, and remained in operation until 1904. Besides the post office, Philothea had a Catholic church and several stores.

References

Unincorporated communities in Mercer County, Ohio
Unincorporated communities in Ohio